Nauru has one government-owned radio station and two television stations, one of which is government owned. The island has telephone service under country code 674. The island's Internet service is provided by CenPacNet. The country's ccTLD is .nr.

Telephones 

In 1994, there were 2,000 telephone land lines in use. There were 450 mobile cellular phones in use at the time. There were adequate local and international radiotelephone communications provided via Australian facilities. There is one satellite earth station, provided by Intelsat.

Telephone numbers in Nauru 
The country code is +674, and the international call prefix is 00. There are seven other numbers in the system, with the format of numbers being +0067433724411.

Telephone ranges 
In August 2011, Criden Appi, the Director of Telecommunications (Regulatory), said that Nauru advises "only 556xxxx, 557xxxx, 558xxxx are in use for mobiles and there are no landlines in service". In the ranges, X=0-9, and Y=0-9.

Mobile telephone number ranges

Fixed line area codes

Special Numbers

Radio and television 
As of 1998, there was 1 FM station, and no shortwave or AM stations. The FM station, Radio Nauru FM 105, is owned by the government. In 1997, there were 7,000 radios. 

As of that year, there were 500 television sets. There are two television stations. One station is government-owned Nauru Television and mainly rebroadcasts British Broadcasting Corporation, the Australian Broadcasting Corporation and Television New Zealand, while the other is a private sports network.

Internet 

The country's ccTLD is .nr. Internet service in the country is provided by CenPacNet. Domains must be paid, and can be ordered from CenPacNet. The original configuration of the .nr TLD domain was performed by Shaun Moran of Australian ComTech Communications in 1998 as part of the first Internet connectivity on the island. There was a lengthy process with IANA to get the .nr domain approved and assigned at the time. The setup of .nr was done in 2002 by Franck Martin using specific custom code.

Internet censorship 

In 2015, the Nauruan government blocked websites including Facebook as part of a crackdown on Internet pornography, especially child pornography. Opposition MP Matthew Batsiua has said that the Facebook ban is actually intended to stifle criticism of the government. The ban has now been lifted as of 2018.

References 

 
Nauru
Nauru